The Sukhoi Su-80 (formerly known as the Sukhoi S-80) is a Russian twin-turboprop, twin-boom STOL transport aircraft.

Design and development
The Su-80 program was supposed to start in the late 1990s, but due to lack of funds, it was postponed for several years.  A prototype of the combined Freight/Passenger Su-80GP was built and its first flight was planned for early 1998, but the program was delayed again. The first flight of the prototype was at the 2001 MAKS in Moscow issued Zhukovsky.

On 4 September 2001, Igor Wotinzew started with the prototype, 82911, on his first flight. In early 2006, the Su-80 entered production in the KnAAPO factory in Komsomolsk-on-Amur.

The first model of the turboprop transporter Sukhoi S-80 was shown at the 46th Paris International Air and Space Show, 2005. The plane is being developed by Sukhoi OKB and the aircraft factory in Komsomolsk/Amur under the "konversija" program. The aircraft is intended to replace the An-24/26, An-28 and Yak-40, and to compete with the Antonov An-38 . The design of the machine is very similar to the Scaled Composites ATTT and the Rockwell OV-10. It has three lift-generating surfaces: the primary wings; two fins at the rear of the fuselage which join the booms to the fuselage; and the horizontal stabilizer which joins the two vertical fins at the rear of the booms. Two General Electric CT7-9B turboprop engines are housed in bays at the front of the tail booms.

The sleek hull offers space for 30 passengers, and a "beaver-tail" cargo ramp is fitted at the rear of the fuselage, which allows for easy loading and unloading of cargo.

Operational history
 Eight aircraft from the second production (first definitive) batch were earmarked for delivery to customers.

Commercial orders
Blagoveshchensk Airlines, Chukotavia, Dalavia, the Petropavlovsk-Kamchatsky Air Enterprise, and Polar Airlines all signed preliminary agreements to acquire the type. The KnAAPO factory airline was expected to be the Su-80's first operator.

Military orders
The Kazakhstan Border Guards tentatively ordered ten Su-80s, while the Chinese People's Liberation Army Air Force, Jordanian Air Force, Royal Malaysian Air Force, Indonesian Air Force and Republic of Korea Air Force all expressed interest.

Ultimately, no aircraft performed active service. In 2022, it does not appear that any of these aircraft are operational.

Variants
There are two different models of the Su-80. The four pre-series aircraft were of a short-fuselage design, while the fifth, sixth and seventh prototypes were stretched by 1.4 m (4 ft 7 in) allowing an extra row of passenger seats.
 S-80PC (Su-80GP)  Combination Passenger and Freight carrier
 S-80TC  light military troop transport
 S-80A  Air Ambulance
 S-80F  Fishery patrol
 S-80PT  (patrol transport) for the Russian Border Guards, can be armed with machine guns, light auto-cannon, rockets, bombs, and surveillance devices.
S-80GE  Geological support
Su-80GP-100  Transporter

Specifications (Su-80GP)

See also

References

External links

 Sukhoi official page
 KNAAPO (the manufacturer's) page

2000s Russian civil utility aircraft
Su-80
Twin-boom aircraft
High-wing aircraft
STOL aircraft
2000s Russian airliners
Aircraft first flown in 2001
Twin-turboprop tractor aircraft